KPCC or K. P. C. C. may refer to

 Karnataka Pradesh Congress Committee, Karnataka state unit of Indian National Congress party
 Kerala Pradesh Congress Committee, Kerala state unit of Indian National Congress party
 KPCC (FM), radio station in Pasadena, California
 King's Privy Council for Canada, a Canadian government body
 Communist Party of the Soviet Union (КПСС), ruling party of the Soviet Union